Sefrania is a genus of beetles in the family Dermestidae, containing the following species:

 Sefrania bleusei Pic, 1899
 Sefrania sabulorum (Beal, 1984)

References

Dermestidae